Marquette Dennison Robinson (born September 7, 1978 in Monroe, Louisiana) is a former American football defensive back of the Arena Football League (AFL). He now serves as the Assistant Defensive Coordinator and ((Director of Player Development))for the Chicago Blitz of the Continental Indoor Football League (CIFL). He last played for the Chicago Slaughter of the CIFL. He attended the University of West Georgia.

Early life
Robinson attended Murphy High School in Mobile, Alabama, and was a letterman in football and basketball. He was a two-time All-State selection in both sports. Marquette Dennison Robinson graduated from Murphy High School in 1996.

College career
Robinson attended Mississippi Gulf Coast Community College and was a two-year letterman in football. Robinson graduated from Mississippi Gulf Coast and attended the University of West Georgia, where he lettered during the 1998 season.

Professional career

RFL
In the first half of 1999, Robinson played for the Mobile Admirals of the short-lived Regional Football League.

CFL
In the second half of 1999, Robinson played for the Toronto Argonauts of the Canadian Football League, where he intercepted 7 passes.

af2
Robinson played one season of in the af2 for the Quad City Steamwheelers and finished the season with 59 receptions for 660 yards and 15 touchdowns on offense, and defensively, he posted 67 tackles, eight interceptions, and 28 pass deflections.

AFL
Dennison quickly became an impact player when he played for the Las Vegas Gladiators (2002–2004). He was named AFL All-Rookie team in 2002. In 2005, Robinson signed with the Grand Rapids Rampage. In 2008, while playing for the Chicago Rush, Johnson was named Arena Football League Defensive Player of the Year. He earned this title with leading the AFL with 13 interceptions and returning two for a touchdown.

CIFL
Robinson spent the 2009 season as a member of the Chicago Slaughter of the Continental Indoor Football League because the Arena Football League suspended operations for the 2009 season. In his first five games with the Slaughter, Robinson picked off four passes and returned two for touchdowns.

References

External links
Chicago Rush's bio page
AFL stats

1978 births
Living people
Sportspeople from Monroe, Louisiana
American football defensive backs
Mississippi Gulf Coast Bulldogs football players
West Georgia Wolves football players
Quad City Steamwheelers players
New Jersey Gladiators players
Las Vegas Gladiators players
Grand Rapids Rampage players
Chicago Rush players
Chicago Slaughter players
Regional Football League players